Čateška Gora (in older sources also Čatežka Gora) is a settlement in the Municipality of Litija in central Slovenia. The area is part of the traditional region of Lower Carniola. It is now included with the rest of the municipality in the Central Sava Statistical Region; until January 2014 the municipality was part of the Central Slovenia Statistical Region.

The local church is dedicated to Saint Ulrich and  belongs to the Parish of Čatež–Zaplaz. It is a 16th-century building that was extended in the 18th century, when the new nave was built.

References

External links

Čateška Gora on Geopedia

Populated places in the Municipality of Litija